The existence of a Christian community in the city of Najran is attested by several historical sources of the Arabian peninsula, where it recorded as having been created in the 5th century AD or perhaps a century earlier. According to the Arab Muslim historian Ibn Ishaq, Najran was the first place where Christianity took root in South Arabia.

In the early 6th century, the Christians are said to have been persecuted by a Himyarite king named Dhu Nuwas. Dhu Nuwas was eventually defeated after foreign intervention from Abyssinia. In the 7th century, Christians of Najran interacted with the Islamic prophet Muhammad, who allowed them to worship in his mosque. There is evidence that the community continued to thrive until the 9th century; the community no longer exists today.

Pre-Christian Najran
Prior to the rise of Christianity, the people of Najran were polytheists and worshipped a tall date-palm tree, for which also they had an annual festival when they hung upon it the finest garments they could find, and female ornaments. Then they would come and dance around it the whole day. During this period, they had a chief named Abdullah ibn ath-Thamir who became the first Najranite to embrace Christianity. A pious Christian builder and bricklayer named Phemion settled among them and led them to his religion and its religious laws, which they adopted.

Before the advent of Islam, it appears from indications in the Qur'an it would appear that the Jews to the West of the Himyarite Kingdom, in western Arabia, maintained some form of rabbinical organisation, possibly connected to late antique Judaism, and were not wholly cut off from their brethren elsewhere in the Middle East. One source speaks of rabbis from Tiberias itself enjoying the hospitality of Dhu Nuwas's court. The apparent conversion of local Himyarite rulers to Judaism, or some form of a Judaic monotheism, as early as the late fourth century under the Tabbāi'a dynasty, is indirect evidence that suggests that effective Jewish proselytization was active in the region.

Christian era
The Christians of Najran were divided into two sects. One drew on a variety of Nestorianism, which a local merchant had acquired during a sojourn in al-Hira, and took back to Najran sometime during the reign of the Sassanid ruler Yazdegerd II. The other was a form of Miaphysitism. had suffered an earlier, but brief, stint of persecution with the advent of the new dynasty under the Himyarite ruler Shurihbi'īl Yakkuf (or Sharahbil Yakuf, c.468-480). The Jewish faith had strong roots within the Himyarite kingdom when Dhu Nuwas rose to power, and not only in Zafar but Najran also, it seems that several synagogues had been built.

Najran was an oasis, with a large population of Christian Arabs, and a significant community of Jews, unlike most Ṣayhadic people of that zone, had only come under the authority of the Himyarite kingdom in the early fifth century, more or less around the time that a local merchant, one Hayyān by name, had visited Constantinople and underwent conversion at al-Hīra, during a later journey. On his return to his native town, he began to proselytise on behalf of the new religion.

It was also the seat of a Bishopric. It sheltered an oligarchy of Christian merchants which were as rich as any in Edessa or Alexandria. It had been an important stop on the spice route from Hadhramaut. Najran had been an important centre of Christianity in South Arabia and the focus of international intrigues in which economics, politics, and religion were all entangled.

The bishops of Najran, who were probably Miaphysites, came to the great fairs of Mina and Ukaz, and preached Christianity, each seated on a camel as in a pulpit. The Church of Najran was called the Ka'bat Najran. (Note that several other shrines in Arabia were also called Ka'aba meaning square like building). The Ka'aba Najran at Jabal Taslal drew worshippers for some 40 years during the pre-Islamic era. The Arabian sources single out Khath'am, as a Christian tribe which used to perform the pilgrimage to the Christian Ka'aba of Najran. When Najran was occupied by Dhu Nuwas, the Ka'aba Najran was burned together with the bones of its martyrs and some 2,000 live Christians within it.

Commercial reasons probably induced Christians to explore the possibilities in the area at an early period but the first attested Christian mission dates to that of Theophilos the Indian, a Christian of the Arian persuasion, who was active during the reign of Constantius II, and who was reported to have converted the Himyarites around 354/5.

Reign of Dhu Nuwas
In the first quarter of the 6th century, a variety of records refer to a tragic episode in which a local king, Yusuf As'ar Dhu Nuwas, who had converted to Judaism and subjected the local Christian community to persecution, reportedly in retribution for the burning of a synagogue. The events comprised episodes involving a massacre of Ethiopians in a Yemen garrison, the destruction of churches, punitive expeditions in a number of regions, and attempts to constrain communities to undergo conversion to Judaism. The most infamous episode concerns the martyrdom of the Christian denizens in the great oasis of Najrān, culminating in the execution of Arethas, an incident alluded to in the Qur'an, in Sura 85:4-8, where however the Christians are described as Believers martyred for their faith. These circumstances have a geopolitical dimension as well, in that there are indications that these Jewish communities had connections with the Iranian Sassanid kingdom, while the Christians, though Monophysites, were linked to Byzantine interests.

After coming to the throne through a coup d'état, Dhu Nuwas launched a campaign which swept away an Aksumite garrison in Zafar, where a church was put to the torch, and then invaded the Tihāma coastal lowlands where a partially Christianized population dwelt, and where he took over key centres as far as the Bab el-Mandeb. He sent one of his generals, a Jewish prince, north to Najran in order to impose an economic blockade on the oasis by cutting off the trade route to Qaryat al-Faw in eastern Arabia.
The Christians of Najran were massacred in 524 by the Himyarite king, Yusuf As'ar Dhu Nuwas. The Najranite Christians, like other Southern Arabian Christian communities, had close connections with the ecclesiastical authorities in Byzantium and Abyssinia. They were identified by virtue of their religion as "pro-Axumite" and "pro-Byzantine".

Dhu Nuwas hoped to create, in the rich lands of Southern Arabia, a "Davidic" kingship which was independent of the Christian powers. He also considered Najran to be a Byzantine base that controlled the Red Sea trade route and did harm to the economic situation of Himyar.

When Dhu Nuwas invaded, he called upon its people to abandon Christianity and embrace Judaism. When they refused, he had them thrown into burning ditches alive. Estimates of the death toll from this event range up to 20,000 in some sources. Some sources say that Dus Dhu Tha'laban from the Saba tribe was the only man able to escape the massacre of Najran, who fled to Constantinople to seek help and promptly reported everything.

Fall of Dhu Nuwas
Dhu Nuwas' reign, and his persecution of Christians, was brought to an end after he was defeated by an Ethiopian army. Some sources state that the emperor of Byzantium, Justin I requested his ally, the Abyssinian king Ella-Asbeha of Aksum, to invade Najran, kill Dhu-Nuwas, and annex Himyar. According to the Book of the Himyarites, Najrani Christian refugees (including one by name of Umyya) arrived in Abyssinia and requested aid from its king. In either case, the Abyssinians sent an army of 7,000 men led by Abraha al-Ashram, the Christian viceroy of the Negus of Abyssinia, and defeated Dhu Nuwas's forces and restored Christian rule in Najran.

In his 524 AD letter describing the Najran persecutions in detail, the West-Syrian debater Simeon, the bishop of Beth Arsham describes how female martyrs rushed in to join "our parents and brothers and sisters who have died for the sake of Christ our lord".

In one exchange, reminiscent of the Acts of Marta and her father Pusai, a freeborn woman of Najran named Habsa bint Hayyan taunts Dhu Nuwas with the memory of her father:

Literary references
The persecution of Christians in Najran has left a legacy in both Christian literature as well as in the Qur'an.

Simeon of Beth Arsham's Second letter preserves yet another memorably gruesome episode. After seeing her Christian kinsmen burned alive, Ruhm, a great noblewoman of Najran, brings her daughter before the Himyarite king and instructs him: "Cut off our heads, so that we may go join our brothers and my daughter's father." The executioners comply, slaughtering her daughter and granddaughter before Ruhm's eyes and forcing her to drink her blood. The king then asks, "How does your daughter's blood taste to you?" The martyr replies, "Like a pure spotless offering: that is what it tasted like in my mouth and in my soul."

The martyrs of Najran are mentioned in the Surat al-Buruj of the Q'uran 85:4–8, where the persecutions are condemned and the steadfast believers are praised:

The stories of the Najran deaths spread quickly to other Christian realms, where they were recounted in terms of heroic martyrdom for the cause of Christ. Their martyrdom led to Najran becoming a major pilgrimage centre that, for a time, rivaled Mecca to the north. The leader of the Arabs of Najran who was executed during the period of persecution, Al-Harith, was canonized by the Roman Catholic Church as St. Aretas.

The Martyrdom of the Christians of Najran is celebrated in the Roman Calendar on the 24 October; in the Jacobite Menologies on 31 December; in the Arabic Feasts of the Melkites on 2 October; in the Armenian Synaxarium on the 20 October, and in the Ethiopian Senkesar on November 22.

Islamic era
Starting in the 7th century, Islam spread in Arabia. The Christians of Najran would interact with the Islamic Prophet Muhammad and later Muslims.

Delegation to Muhammad
Around 631 AD,  Prophet Muhammad began sending letter to various communities, inviting them to convert to Islam. Such a letter was also sent to the Christians of Najran; it was delivered by Khaled ibn al-Walid and Ali ibn Abi Talib. When the Christians did not convert, Muhammad sent Al-Mughira to explain Islam further to Christians of Najran. In response, the Christians sent a delegation of 60 people (including 45 scholars) to visit Prophet Muhammad in Medina. Among them were Abdul Masih of Bani Kinda, their chief, and Abdul Harith, bishop of Bani Harith. Muhammad permitted Christians to pray in his mosque, which they did turning towards the east.

When the delegation arrived, the Prophet Muhammad allowed them to pray in his mosque. Some Muslims were reportedly uncomfortable with Muhammad allowing the Christians to pray in a mosque. The Christians are said to have prayed facing the East. Muhammad also provided them with a place to stay.

The Christians delegation tried to convert Muhammad to Christianity and the two sides entered into a debate.  Muhammad concluded that some Christian teachings were incompatible with Islam and that Islam was the true religion. Though both sides failed to convince the other, they nevertheless worked out a mutually acceptable relationship, and entered a treaty of peace.

The Treaty of Najran guaranteed to the Christians security for "their lives, their religion and their property". It gave Christians freedom of religion, stipulating that there would be no interference in the practice of Christianity, nor would any cross be destroyed. While the Christians were required to pay a tax (jizya) they would not have to pay a tithe (ushr). The tax on them was not to exceed the means of a Christian. Muhammad also stated "The Muslims must not abandon the Christians, neglect them, and leave them without help and assistance since I have made this pact with them on behalf of Allah."

The treaty was significant politically and economically. By leaving local leaders intact, Muhammad cultivated new allies and facilitated tax collection.

Umar bin Al-Khattab
There are reports that the second Caliph Umar ibn al-Khattab ordered Christians of Najran to vacate the city and emigrate out of the Arabian peninsula, based on Muhammad’s orders.  However, the historicity of this is disputed, and there is historical evidence that Christians continued to live in the area for at least 200 more years. It may be that the orders of Umar were not carried out or might have applied only to Christians living in Najran itself, not to those settled round about. Some migrated to Syria, likely in the district of Trachonitis (the Lajat plain) and around the extant city of Najran, Syria; but the greater part settled in the vicinity of Al-Kufa in predominantly Christian Southern Iraq, where the colony of Al-Najraniyyah long maintained the memory of their expatriation.

Najran accord of 897
The Christian community of Najran still had considerable political weight in the late ninth century. According to a Yemeni Arab source, the first Zaydite Imam of Yemen, al-Hadi Ila l-Haqq Yahya ibn al-Hussain (897–911) concluded an accord with the Christians and the Jews of the oasis on 897, at the time of the foundation of the Zaydite principality.

A second Yemeni source alludes to the Christians of Najran in muharram 390 (999–1000). The oasis was still one third Christian and one third Jewish, according to the testimony of the Persian traveller, Ibn al-Mujawir.

Decline
Eventually the Old Najran which was Christian disappeared, and is now represented by Al-Ukhdood, a desolate village, while another the Najran which is Islamic, has now appeared in its vicinity.

See also

 Arethas (martyr)
Najran, Syria

Citations

References

.
.
.
.
.
.
.
.
.
.

Najran
Christianity in the Arab world
History of the Arabian Peninsula
Nestorianism
Christianity in Saudi Arabia
History of Christianity in Saudi Arabia
Christianity and Islam
Ancient peoples of the Near East
History of Oriental Orthodoxy
Oriental Orthodoxy in Asia
Christianity in Yemen
Christians of the Rashidun Caliphate
Treaties of Muhammad
6th-century Christian martyrs
Muhammad and other religions